Ben Leslie is an American auto mechanic. He is currently employed at Premium Motorsports as the crew chief of their No. 98 car in the NASCAR Cup Series. He is the younger brother of former Automobile Racing Club of America champion and NASCAR driver Tracy Leslie.

Leslie joined NASCAR in 1994 as a mechanic and tire changer on Ted Musgrave's car, which was owned by Roush Racing. Later, he would go on to hold the same position on Mark Martin's car. In 1998, he moved to Roush's new team, the #26 Ford driven by Johnny Benson Jr. Originally serving as the team's car chief, he was promoted to interim crew chief midway through the season and had a pair of ninth-place finishes with Benson. After spending the first part of the 1999 season with Benson, he became the car chief of Matt Kenseth's car, and the team won Rookie of the Year honors in 2000.

After several races in 2001, Leslie was moved to the crew chief position of the #97 team driven by rookie Kurt Busch. Leslie and Busch won the pole at the Mountain Dew Southern 500 and had five top-ten finishes. At the end of the season, he was moved again to Mark Martin's team. They won the Coca-Cola 600 but lost the championship by 38 points. He was moved again at the end of the season to the #21 Wood Brothers Racing Ford driven by Ricky Rudd, but the team struggled with only five top-tens and dropped to twenty-third in points. After winning one pole and garnering two top-ten finishes with Rudd in 2004 NASCAR Nextel Cup Series, Leslie left the Wood Brothers to take a position as field director for Ford Racing.

Leslie stayed with Ford for several years before returning to pit road as crew chief of the #28 Yates Racing Ford driven by Travis Kvapil. They had two top-twenty finishes, however, the team was shut down after five races due to a lack of sponsorship. Afterwards, he joined Yates' affiliate team, Hall of Fame Racing as crew chief for Bobby Labonte and eventually Erik Darnell for the rest of the season. In 2010 he moved to Roush Fenway's #6 team to be crew chief for rookie Ricky Stenhouse Jr.  In 2016 he took over as the crew chief for Cole Whitt at Premium Motorsports midway through the season.

References

External links 
 

Living people
Date of birth missing (living people)
NASCAR crew chiefs
Year of birth missing (living people)